Richardson v. Ramirez, 418 U.S. 24 (1974), was a landmark decision by the Supreme Court of the United States in which the Court held, 6–3, that convicted felons could be barred from voting without violating the Fourteenth Amendment to the Constitution. Such felony disenfranchisement is practiced in a number of states.

Background

In May 1972, Abran Ramirez, who had previously been convicted of a felony, was refused voter registration by a county clerk in San Luis Obispo County, California, on grounds that he had one or more felonies on his criminal record. Joining with other plaintiffs who had also been denied registration for similar reasons, Ramirez brought a class-action lawsuit against Jerry Brown, who at the time was California's Secretary of State, challenging a state constitutional provision that permanently disenfranchised anyone convicted of an “infamous crime”, unless the right to vote was restored by court order or executive pardon. 

Typically in voting rights cases, states must show that the voting restriction is necessary to a “compelling state interest,” and is the least restrictive means of achieving the state's objective. In this case, the plaintiffs argued that the state had no compelling interest to justify denying them the right to vote. The California Supreme Court agreed that the law was unconstitutional. On appeal, however, the U.S. Supreme Court said that a state does not have to prove that its felony disenfranchisement laws serve a compelling state interest.

Opinion of the Court
Oral arguments were held on January 15, 1974. George J. Roth argued on behalf of the state of California, and Martin R. Glick argued on behalf of the petitioners. 

The Supreme Court ruled 6–3 that California's law was constitutional. The majority opinion was written by Justice William Rehnquist. 

The Court relied on Section 2 of the Fourteenth Amendment to the U.S. Constitution, which calls for reducing representation in the U.S. House of Representatives for any state that denies the right to vote to its voters (a provision designed to prevent the Southern states from disenfranchising black citizens after the Civil War). But Section 2 makes an exception for denying voting rights to citizens because of "participation in rebellion, or other crimes." The Court said that this distinguishes felony disenfranchisement from other forms of voting restrictions, which must be narrowly tailored to serve compelling state interests in order to be constitutional.

The Court also reviewed the legislative history of Section 2, and relied as well on the fact that when the Fourteenth Amendment was adopted in 1868, over half of the U.S. states allowed denying the right to vote to "persons convicted of felonies or infamous crimes."

See also
 Hunter v. Underwood, 
 Lists of United States Supreme Court cases
 Lists of United States Supreme Court cases by volume
 List of United States Supreme Court cases, volume 418

References

External links
 
 
Gabriel J. Chin, "Reconstruction, Felon Disenfranchisement and the Right to Vote: Did the Fifteenth Amendment Repeal Section 2 of the Fourteenth Amendment?", 92 Georgetown Law Journal 259(2004)

United States Supreme Court cases
United States Fourteenth Amendment apportionment case law
1974 in United States case law
United States Supreme Court cases of the Burger Court
Right of prisoners to vote
Right of felons to vote